Parliamentary elections were held in Cape Verde on 17 December 1995. The number of seats was reduced from 79 to 72. The result was a victory for the ruling Movement for Democracy, which won 50 of the 72 seats. Voter turnout was 76.52%.

Results

References

Cape Verde
Elections in Cape Verde
Parliamentary
Cape Verde